Richard Hammer (February 7, 1897 – October 3, 1969) was a German politician of the Free Democratic Party (FDP) and former member of the German Bundestag.

Life 
Hammer was a member of the state parliament in Hesse from 1946 to 9 December 1949. He was a member of the German Bundestag from its first election in 1949 to 1957. In 1949 he was directly elected in Darmstadt with 36.8% of the valid votes cast, and in 1953 he entered parliament via the Hessian FDP state list. Since 7 December 1949, he had been chairman of the Bundestag's Committee on Health Care.

Literature

References

1897 births
1969 deaths
Members of the Bundestag for Hesse
Members of the Bundestag 1953–1957
Members of the Bundestag 1949–1953
Members of the Bundestag for the Free Democratic Party (Germany)
Members of the Landtag of Hesse